Samuel Sidney Graves (November 30, 1901 – December 26, 1983) was an outfielder in Major League Baseball. Nicknamed "Whitey", he played for the Boston Braves in 1927.

References

External links

1901 births
1983 deaths
Major League Baseball outfielders
Boston Braves players
Bowdoin Polar Bears baseball players
Baseball players from Massachusetts
People from Marblehead, Massachusetts
Sportspeople from Essex County, Massachusetts